James C. Katz is an American film historian and preservationist who has restored and reconstructed a number of classic films. Though he began his career as a film producer, he concentrated his attention on preserving existing films.

His film preservation projects include: Spartacus, My Fair Lady, and Alfred Hitchcock's Vertigo and Rear Window. He frequently collaborates with Bob O'Neil and Robert A. Harris, with whom he shared the King Vidor Award for Excellence in Filmmaking at the 2000 San Luis Obispo International Film Festival.

References

Living people
21st-century American historians
21st-century American male writers
American film producers
Year of birth missing (living people)
Place of birth missing (living people)
American male non-fiction writers